The Williams River is a tributary of the Gauley River, 33 miles (53 km) long, in east-central West Virginia, USA.  Via the Gauley, Kanawha and Ohio Rivers, it is part of the watershed of the Mississippi River, draining an area of 132 square miles (342 km²) in a sparsely populated region of the southern Allegheny Mountains and the unglaciated portion of the Allegheny Plateau.

Name
The river has also been known historically as the South Fork of the Gauley River  In Webster County, it collects a short tributary known as the Middle Fork Williams River, which itself collects the North Branch Middle Fork Williams River. The river most likely was named after a landowner named Williams.

Geography
The Williams River rises in southern Pocahontas County, approximately 5 miles (8 km) west of Marlinton, and flows initially northwardly, then westwardly into southern Webster County, where it joins the Gauley River approximately 2 miles (3 km) southeast of Cowen.  It flows for much of its length in the Monongahela National Forest, including the Cranberry Wilderness, in an area that was heavily logged in the early 20th century and has since been reforested.  Coal mining activity took place along the river's lower course into the 1970s.

Fishing
The Williams River is regarded as one of the five best trout fishing streams in West Virginia, due to its cold water temperature, low turbidity, and frequent stockings of trout (amounting to 27,000 pounds annually) by the West Virginia Division of Natural Resources.

See also
List of West Virginia rivers

References

Rivers of West Virginia
Allegheny Plateau
Monongahela National Forest
Rivers of Pocahontas County, West Virginia
Rivers of Webster County, West Virginia